Minnesota Amendment 2 (also called Voter ID Amendment) was a proposed legislatively referred constitutional amendment that was on the ballot on November 6, 2012. If approved, it would have required a form of photographic identification before being permitted to vote in Minnesota municipal, state, and federal elections. However, it was defeated with 53.84% voting against and 46.16% for the measure.

Legislative approval
The Minnesota Legislature approved the amendment for the ballot in April 2012 on essentially a party-line vote. The amendment was promoted by Rep. Mary Kiffmeyer, R-Big Lake, who had formerly served as Minnesota Secretary of State.

Support and opposition
Institutional support for the measure broke down largely by party, with DFL leaders opposing the amendment, and Republicans supporting it. The two most recent Secretaries of State lined up on opposite sides, with Kiffmeyer pushing for adoption, and Mark Ritchie speaking against it.

Opinion polls

Results

References

2012 Minnesota elections